The following lists events that happened during 1971 in South Africa.

Incumbents
 State President: Jim Fouché.
 Prime Minister: John Vorster.
 Chief Justice: Lucas Cornelius Steyn then Newton Ogilvie Thompson.

Events
February
 27 – The oil tanker Wafra grounds near Cape Agulhas, causing considerable environmental damage.

March
 10 – Two Buccaneer aircraft of 24 Squadron SAAF, prescribed to by Headquarters, attempt to sink SS Wafra with  missiles but succeeds only in starting a fire.

Unknown date
 St Lucia Lake and the turtle beaches and coral reefs of Maputaland are listed by the Convention on Wetlands of International Importance (RAMSAR).
 The International Court of Justice gives an advisory opinion supporting the view of the United Nations for South Africa to relinquish control of South West Africa.
 Kamuzu Banda, president of Malawi, is the first Black President to visit South Africa.

Births
 20 February – Joost van der Westhuizen, rugby scrum-half (d. 2017)
 3 March – Jet Novuka, actor
 15 March – Naka Drotské, rugby player
 8 April – Fikile Mbalula, national minister
 22 April – Jannie de Beer, rugby player
 13 May – Fana Mokoena, actor
 28 June – Elon Musk, South African-born Canadian-American entrepreneur, engineer, inventor and investor
 21 July – Robby Brink, rugby player
 30 July – Mzukisi Sikali, triple world champion boxer (d. 2005)
 4 September – Lance Klusener, cricket player
 15 September – Wayne Ferreira, tennis player
 28 September – Braam van Straaten, rugby player
 8 October – Krynauw Otto, rugby player
 22 October – Amanda Coetzer, tennis player
 26 October – Brendan Augustine, soccer player
 12 November – Gert Thys, long-distance runner
 14 November – Nick Boraine, actor
 29 November – Esme Kruger, lawn bowler
 3 December – Pieter Rossouw, rugby player
 17 December – Alan Khan, media and radio personality

Deaths
  27 October – Ahmed Timol, activist and political leader. (b. 1941)

Railways

Locomotives

Four new Cape gauge locomotive types enter service on the South African Railways:
 July – The first of 125 Class 34-000 General Electric type U26C diesel-electric locomotives.
 October – The first of fifty Class 34-200 General Motors Electro-Motive Division type GT26MC diesel-electric locomotives.
 Fifty Class 6E1, Series 2 electric locomotives.
 The first of one hundred and fifty Class 6E1, Series 3 locomotives.

References

South Africa
Years in South Africa
History of South Africa